The 1956–57 season was West Ham's seventeenth season in the Second Division since their relegation in season 1931–32. The club were managed by Ted Fenton and the team captain was Noel Cantwell.

Season summary
West Ham finished eighth and were at no time in either of the top two, promotion places.  John Dick was the top scorer with 13 goals in all competitions. Top scorers in the league were Billy Dare and Eddie Lewis with eight goals. Malcolm Musgrove made the most appearances; 44 in all competitions. West Ham made the fourth round of the FA Cup before being eliminated by Everton.

Second Division

Results
West Ham United's score comes first

Legend

Football League Second Division

FA Cup

Squad

References

West Ham United F.C. seasons
West Ham United F.C. season
West Ham United F.C. season
West Ham United